Chhel Anandji Vayeda (1935 – 12 November 2014) was a Gujarati art director and production designer from India.

Early life
Chhel was born in 1935 in Dwarka (now in Gujarat) to Anandji and Jayakunvar. He was the youngest in seven siblings. His family moved to Bhuj when he was ten years old. He completed matriculation and joined School of Arts, Bhuj affiliated with University of Bombay. He started his job as assistant draftsman in state bus transport, GSRTC. His elder brother practicing law in Mumbai introduced him to Dr. D. G. Vyas who was an art critic and director of Sir J. J. School of Arts. He resigned from GSRTC and moved to Mumbai to study in Sir J. J. School of Arts in 1960.

Career
Gujarati stage director actor Honey Chhaya brought him in the field of art direction and production design in 1963 at Rangbhoomi Natya Academy. His first Gujarati play as an independent set designer, Parinita, produced by Rangbhoomi won him the first prize in state level play competition.

He joined Paresh Daru in 1966 and the duo was called Chhel-Paresh thereafter. Together they designed sets of more than 700 plays in five languages including Gujarati, Marathi, Hindi, English, Sanskrit and Oriya; and 55 films in six languages and TV serials in three languages. These films include Train to Pakistan (1998), Ankahee (1985), Tere Shahar Mein, Khubsoorat and Lorie (1984). He was an art director of some Gujarati films including Kanku (1969), Upar Gagan Vishal, Dada Ho Dikri, Lakho Fulani.

He died on 12 November 2014 at Mumbai.

Personal life
He married Kusum in 1964. His son Sanjay Chhel is also writer and director. His daughter Alpana Buch is an TV actress who is married to actor-director Mehul Buch.

References

Indian art directors
Indian production designers
2014 deaths
Gujarati people
1935 births
Gujarati theatre
People from Devbhoomi Dwarka district
20th-century Indian designers
Artists from Gujarat